Allium israeliticum is a species of onion native to Israel, Palestine and Jordan. Bulbs are egg-shaped, up to 30 mm long. Scape is flexuous, up to 40 cm long. Leaves are thick, recurved, up to 30 cm long, tapering toward the tip. Tepals are translucent white with green midveins; anthers yellow; ovary green.

References

israeliticum
Onions
Plants described in 2012